Smeringopus is a genus of cellar spiders that was first described by Eugène Louis Simon in 1890.

Species
 it contains fifty-five species, found in Africa, South America, Asia, Australia, and on the Pacific Islands:
S. affinitatus Strand, 1906 – Ethiopia
S. arambourgi Fage, 1936 – Ethiopia, Somalia
S. atomarius Simon, 1910 – Namibia, Botswana, South Africa
S. badplaas Huber, 2012 – South Africa
S. blyde Huber, 2012 – South Africa
S. bujongolo Huber, 2012 – Congo, Uganda
S. butare Huber, 2012 – Congo, Rwanda, Burundi
S. bwindi Huber, 2012 – Congo, Uganda
S. carli Lessert, 1915 – Uganda, Tanzania, Comoros, Madagascar
S. chibububo Huber, 2012 – Mozambique
S. chogoria Huber, 2012 – Kenya
S. cylindrogaster (Simon, 1907) – West, Central Africa
S. dehoop Huber, 2012 – South Africa
S. dundo Huber, 2012 – Congo, Angola
S. florisbad Huber, 2012 – South Africa
S. hanglip Huber, 2012 – South Africa
S. harare Huber, 2012 – Zimbabwe
S. hypocrita Simon, 1910 – Namibia, South Africa
S. isangi Huber, 2012 – Congo
S. kalomo Huber, 2012 – Zambia, Zimbabwe, Mozambique, Madagascar
S. katanga Huber, 2012 – Congo
S. koppies Huber, 2012 – Botswana, South Africa
S. lesnei Lessert, 1936 – Mozambique, Zimbabwe
S. lesserti Kraus, 1957 – West, Central Africa
S. lineiventris Simon, 1890 – Yemen
S. lotzi Huber, 2012 – South Africa
S. lubondai Huber, 2012 – Congo
S. luki Huber, 2012 – Congo
S. lydenberg Huber, 2012 – South Africa
S. mayombe Huber, 2012 – Congo
S. mgahinga Huber, 2012 – Congo, Uganda
S. mlilwane Huber, 2012 – Eswatini, South Africa
S. moxico Huber, 2012 – Angola
S. mpanga Huber, 2012 – Uganda
S. natalensis Lawrence, 1947 – Mozambique, South Africa. Introduced to Australia
S. ndumo Huber, 2012 – South Africa
S. ngangao Huber, 2012 – Kenya, Tanzania
S. oromia Huber, 2012 – Ethiopia
S. pallidus (Blackwall, 1858) (type) – Africa. Introduced to the Caribbean, South America, Sri Lanka, China, Laos, Philippines, Indonesia, Australia, Pacific islands
S. peregrinoides Kraus, 1957 – Central, East Africa
S. peregrinus Strand, 1906 – Kenya, Uganda, Tanzania, Madagascar
S. principe Huber, 2012 – São Tomé and Príncipe
S. roeweri Kraus, 1957 – Congo, Rwanda, Tanzania, Malawi
S. rubrotinctus Strand, 1913 – Rwanda, Burundi
S. ruhiza Huber, 2012 – Uganda, Burundi
S. sambesicus Kraus, 1957 – Mozambique
S. saruanle Huber, 2012 – Somalia
S. sederberg Huber, 2012 – South Africa
S. similis Kraus, 1957 – Namibia
S. thomensis Simon, 1907 – São Tomé and Príncipe
S. tombua Huber, 2012 – Angola
S. turkana Huber, 2012 – Ethiopia, Kenya
S. ubicki Huber, 2012 – South Africa
S. uisib Huber, 2012 – Namibia
S. zonatus Strand, 1906 – Ethiopia

See also
 List of Pholcidae species

References

Araneomorphae genera
Pholcidae
Spiders of Africa